Self-evaluation is the process by which the self-concept is socially negotiated and modified. It is a scientific and cultural truism that self-evaluation is motivated. Motives influence the ways in which people select self-relevant information, gauge its veracity, draw inferences about themselves, and make plans for the future. Empirically-oriented psychologists have identified and investigated Three cardinal self-evaluation motives (or self-motives) relevant to the development, maintenance, and modification of self-views.
These are self-enhancement, self-assessment and self-verification.

Types

Self-Enhancement

The self-enhancement motive is the motive to improve the positivity of one's self-concept, and to protect the self from negative information (we search for positivity and avoid negativity). This motive influences people's self-evaluations.

For instance, people process information important to the self in a selective manner, focusing on information that has favourable implications to the self and discarding information with unfavourable implications. People also choose to compare themselves socially to others so as to be placed in a favourable position. By doing this, people seek to boost the (self-evaluated) positivity of themselves or to decrease its negativity, hence increasing their levels of self-esteem with the aim of having others see them as more socially desirable.

Self-Assessment

The self-assessment motive is based on the assumption that people want to have an accurate and objective evaluation of the self. To achieve this goal, they work so as to reduce any uncertainty about their abilities or personality traits. Feedback is sought to increase the accuracy and objectivity of previously formed self-conceptions. This is regardless of whether the new information confirms or challenges the previously existing self-conceptions.

Self-Verification

The self-verification motive asserts that what motivates people to engage in the self-evaluation process is the desire to verify their pre-existing self-conceptions, maintaining consistency between their previously formed self-conceptions and any new information that could be important to the self (feedback) By doing this, people get the sense of control and predictability in the social world.

Conditions

Self-Enhancement
The self-enhancement motive states that people want to see themselves favourably. It follows that people should choose tasks with a positive valence, regardless of task diagnosticity (this motive is more active in presence of tasks high in diagnosticity of success than in presence of tasks high in diagnosticity of failure). Tasks that disclosure a failure and negative feedback are considered less important than tasks with an outcome of success or positive feedback. As a result, the former are processed faster and more thoroughly, and remembered better than the latter.

Each motive originated a different type of reaction (cognitive, affective or behavioural). The self-enhancement motive creates both affective and cognitive responses. Affective responses result in negative feedback leading to less positive affect then positive affect. This is moderated by trait modifiability, in the sense that we can find the former event to be especially true for unmodifiable traits. On the other hand, cognitive responses lead to favourable feedback being judged as more accurate, but only in the case of modifiable traits.

Self-Assessment
The self-assessment motive postulates that people want to have an accurate view of their abilities and personality traits. Hence, when evaluating the self people tend to preferably choose tasks that are high in diagnosticity (people want to find out about their uncertain self-conceptions). This is found even when the diagnosis leads to a disclosure of failure (i.e., regardless of task valence).

The responses generated by the self-assessment motive are behavioural responses, which becomes evident by the fact that people choose to receive feedback on their performance (they prefer tasks for which feedback is available,  opposed to tasks with unavailable feedback). This pattern is emphasized when the trait is considered to be modifiable.

Self-Verification
The self-verification motive asserts that people want to verify their previously existing beliefs about the self. No preference regarding the task valence is apparent. Regarding task diagnosticity, people seek knowledge about their certain self-conceptions to a greater extent than they do for their uncertain self-conceptions.

Cognitive responses guide the self-verification motive partially depending on their previously formed self-concept. That is, when a certain trait is present, positive feedback regarding this trait is judged to be more accurate than unfavourable feedback; but when in the presence of the alternative trait, there isn’t any difference in the judgement of the feedback accuracy. However, this pattern is conditional on perceived trait modifiability.

The self-verification motive resulted in cognitive responses to traits considered to be unmodifiable, but not to traits considered modifiable. In the former, positive feedback is considered more accurate than negative feedback, when in the presence of the trait. On the other hand, negative feedback is viewed as more accurate than positive feedback in the presence of the alternative trait.

References

Evaluation
Self